Cindy Mejía Santa María (born August 30, 1987 in Lima) is a Peruvian model and beauty pageant titleholder, who won Miss Perú 2013 and represented her country at the Miss Universe 2013 pageant.

Personal life
Cindy was born in Lima and works as a model.

Pageantry

Miss Perú 2011
Mejia competed in Miss Peru 2011, earning fifth place. For this position she competed in Reina Hispanoamericana 2011, developed in Santa Cruz de la Sierra, Bolivia. There, she became a model of TV show Bienvenida la tarde, hosted by Laura Huarcayo in Frecuencia Latina.

Miss Perú 2012
In June 2012 she competed in Miss Perú, where she earned the title Miss Perú Universo 2013.

Miss Universe 2013
Cindy represented Peru at the 62nd annual Miss Universe pageant held on November 9, 2013 in Moscow, Russia. Although considered a favorite, she failed to place in the semifinals.

References

People from Lima
Peruvian female models
1988 births
Miss Universe 2013 contestants
Living people
Peruvian beauty pageant winners